Davanzo Tate (born January 15, 1985) is a former American and Canadian football defensive back free agent. He was signed by the New York Giants as an undrafted free agent in 2008. He played college football for the Akron Zips.

Tate has also played for the Calgary Stampeders.

External links
Calgary Stampeders bio

1984 births
Living people
People from Austintown, Ohio
Canadian football defensive backs
American football defensive backs
American players of Canadian football
Akron Zips football players
New York Giants players
Calgary Stampeders players